In enzymology, a N-substituted formamide deformylase is an enzyme that catalyzes the chemical reaction

N-benzylformamide + H2O  formate + benzylamine

Thus, the two substrates of this enzyme are N-benzylformamide and H2O, whereas its two products are formate and benzylamine.

This enzyme belongs to the family of hydrolases, those acting on carbon-nitrogen bonds other than peptide bonds, specifically in linear amides.  The systematic name of this enzyme class is N-benzylformamide amidohydrolase and is also called NfdA.  The enzyme is produced by Arthrobacter pascens bacteria.

References 

EC 3.5.1
Enzymes of unknown structure